This is a list of members of the European Parliament for Germany in the 2019 to 2024 session. German MEPs represent the constituency of the same name.

List

References 

Lists of Members of the European Parliament for Germany
Lists of Members of the European Parliament 2019–2024
MEPs for Germany 2019–2024